Isaac Burr Butler (August 22, 1873 – March 17, 1948) was a Major League Baseball pitcher. In 16 career games, he had a 1–10 record, with a 5.34 ERA. He threw right-handed.

External links
Baseball Reference.com page

1873 births
1948 deaths
Baltimore Orioles (1901–02) players
Major League Baseball pitchers
Baseball players from Michigan
Portland Beavers players
Jackson Jaxons players
Detroit Tigers (Western League) players
Seattle Yannigans players
Seattle Rainmakers players
St. Paul Apostles players
St. Paul Saints (Western League) players
Dubuque (minor league baseball) players
Burlington Hawkeyes players
Omaha Omahogs players
St. Joseph Saints players
Toledo Mud Hens players
Oakland Commuters players
Shreveport Giants players
Wheeling Stogies players
Denver Grizzlies (baseball) players
Des Moines Hawkeyes players
Kansas City Blues (baseball) players
Portland Browns players
Grand Rapids Orphans players
Tacoma Tigers players
Santa Cruz Sand Crabs players
Los Angeles Angels (minor league) players
Seattle Giants players
Portland Beavers managers